The Livingston family of New York is a prominent family that migrated from Scotland to the Dutch Republic, and then to the Province of New York in the 17th century. Descended from the 4th Lord Livingston, its members included signers of the United States Declaration of Independence (Philip Livingston) and the United States Constitution (William Livingston). Several members were Lords of Livingston Manor and Clermont Manor, located along the Hudson River in 18th-century eastern New York.

Overview

Descendants of the Livingstons include Presidents of the United States George H. W. Bush and George W. Bush, First Lady of the United States Eleanor Roosevelt, suffragist Elizabeth Cady Stanton, Congressman Bob Livingston of Louisiana, much of the wealthy Astor family, New York Governor Hamilton Fish, actor Montgomery Clift, and actress Jane Wyatt. The eccentric Collyer brothers are alleged to have been descended from the Livingston family.

The Livingston family's burial crypt was established in 1727 at Livingston Memorial Church and Burial Ground in New York. Liberty Hall (also known as the William Livingston House) is the home built by New Jersey Governor William Livingston, a signatory of the Constitution. Located in Elizabethtown, New Jersey, it has been designated as a National Historic Landmark, and it is operated as a museum within the Liberty Hall Campus of Kean University.

Prominent members

Family tree

 John Livingston (1603–1672) ∞ Janet Fleming (1613–1693)
 James Livingston (1646–1673)
 Robert Livingston the Younger (1663–1725) ∞ Margarita Schuyler (b. 1682)
 Engeltje "Angelica" Livingston (1698–1746/7) ∞ Johannes Van Rensselaer (1708–1793)
 Catherine Van Rensselaer (1734–1803) ∞ Philip Schuyler (1733–1804)
 Jeremiah Van Rensselaer (1738–1810) ∞ (1) 1760: Judith Bayard (d. 1764) ∞ (2) 1764: Helena "Lena" Lansing (1743–1795)
 Robert Van Rensselaer (1740–1802) ∞ Cornelia Rutsen (1747–1790)
 James Livingston (1701–1763) ∞ Maria Kierstede (1704–1762)
 Robert James Livingston (1725–1771) ∞  Susanna Smith (1729–1791)
 William Smith Livingston (1755–1795)
 Peter Robert Livingston (1766–1847) ∞ Joanna Livingston (1759–1827)
 Maturin Livingston (1769–1847) ∞ Margaret Lewis (1780–1860) (daughter of Morgan Lewis)
 Morgan Lewis Livingston (1799–1869) ∞ Catharine Currie Manning (1809–1886)
 Robert James Livingston (1811–1891) ∞ Louisa Matilda Storm (1807–1883)
 Louise Matilda Livingston (1836–1920) ∞ Elbridge Thomas Gerry (1837–1927)
 Robert Livingston Gerry, Sr. (1877–1957) ∞ Cornelia Averell Harriman (1884-1966)
 Peter Goelet Gerry (1879–1957) ∞ (1) 1910 (div. 1925): Mathilde Scott Townsend (1885–1949) ∞ (2) 1925: Edith Stuyvesant (née Dresser) Vanderbilt (1873–1958)
 Maturin Livingston Jr. (1815–1888) ∞ Ruth Baylies (1827–1918)
 Elizabeth Livingston (1855–1943) ∞ William George Cavendish-Bentinck (1854–1909) (son of George Augustus Frederick Cavendish-Bentinck)
 Mary Augusta Cavendish-Bentinck (1881–1913) ∞ 1906: John Gorman Ford (d. 1906)
 Ruth Evelyn Cavendish-Bentinck (1883–1978) ∞ 1907: Walter Spencer Morgan Burns (1872–1929) (nephew of J. P. Morgan)
 Ruth T. Livingston (1855–1920) ∞ Ogden Mills (1856–1929)
 Gladys Livingston Mills (1883–1970) ∞ 1907: Henry Carnegie Phipps (1879–1953) (son of Henry Phipps Jr.)
 Ogden Phipps (1908–2002) ∞ (1) Ruth Pruyn (1907–1994); ∞ (2) Lillian Stokes Bostwick (1906–1987)
 Ogden Mills Phipps (1940-2016)
 Barbara Phipps (1911–1987) ∞ Stuart Symington Janney Jr. (1907–1988)
 Stuart S. Janney III
 Audrey Phipps (d. 1992) ∞ Philip Dana Holden (d. 1973)
 Sonia Phipps (1919–2006) ∞ Hans Christoph Farrell, Count of Seherr-Thoss (1912–1992)
 Jane Beatrice Mills (1883–1972) ∞ 1909: Bernard Forbes, 8th Earl of Granard (1874–1948)
 Lady Moira Forbes (1910-1994) ∞ Count Rossi of Switzerland
 Arthur Forbes, 9th Earl of Granard (1915-1992) ∞ Marie-Madeleine Eugenie, Princess of Faucigny Lucinge (d. 1990)
 Lady Eileen Beatrice Forbes (1919-1993) ∞ John Crichton-Stuart, 5th Marquess of Bute (1907–1956)
  Hon. John Forbes (1920-1982)
 Ogden Livingston Mills (1884–1937) ∞ (1) 1911 (div 1919): Margaret Stuyvesant Rutherford (daughter of Anne Harriman Vanderbilt); (2) 1924: Dorothy Randolph Fell
 Henry Beekman Livingston (1818–1862) ∞ Mary Lawrence Livingston (1821–1883)
 Angelica Livingston (1820–1896) ∞ Alexander Hamilton, Jr. (1816–1889)
 Blanche Geraldine Livingston (1822–1897) ∞ Lydig Monson Hoyt (1821–1868)
 Janet Livingston (1730–1819) ∞ William Smith (1728–1793)
 Margaret Livingston (1738–1809) ∞ Peter Robert Livingston (1737–1793)
 Janet Livingston (b. 1703) ∞ Colonel Henry Beekman
 Margaret Beekman (1724–1800) ∞ Robert Livingston (1718–1775)
 John Livingston (1709–1791) ∞ Catharina Ten Broeck (1715–1802)
 James Livingston (1747–1832) ∞ 1772: Elizabeth Simpson (1750–1800)
 Elizabeth Livingston (1773–1818) ∞ Peter Gerrit Smith (1768–1837)
 Gerrit Smith (1797–1874) ∞ (1) 1819: Wealtha Ann Backus (1800–1819) ∞ (2) 1822: Ann Carroll Fitzhugh (1805–1879)
 Elizabeth Smith (1822–1911) ∞ Charles Dudley Miller (1818–1896)
 Greene Smith (1841–1880) ∞ Elizabeth "Bessie" Fitzhugh (1841–1918)
 Edward Livingston (1783–1843) ∞ Martha Nelson (1785–1855)
 Margaret Livingston (1784–1871) ∞ Daniel Cady (1773–1859) 
 Elizabeth Cady (1815–1902) ∞ Henry Brewster Stanton (1805–1887)
 Richard Montgomery Livingston (1787–1838) ∞ Sarah Livingston (1792–1873)
 Catharine Ten Broeck Livingston (1789–1874) ∞  Henry Brevoort Henry (1786–1818)
 Robert Livingston the Elder, 1st Lord of the Manor (1654–1728) ∞ Alida (née Schuyler) Van Rensselaer (1656–1727)
 Johannes Livingston (1680–1720) ∞ 1701: Mary Winthrop (1683–1713) (daughter of Fitz-John Winthrop); ∞ 1713: Elizabeth Knight (1689–1736) (daughter of Sarah Kemble Knight)
 Margaret Livingston (1681–1758) ∞ Samuel Vetch (1668–1732)
 Philip Livingston, 2nd Lord of the Manor (1686–1749) ∞ Catherine Van Brugh (b. 1689)
 Robert Livingston, 3rd Lord of the Manor (1708–1790) ∞ (1) Maria Thong (1711–1765) (granddaughter of Rip Van Dam); ∞ (2) Gertrude (née Van Rensselaer) Schuyler (b. 1714) (daughter of Kiliaen Van Rensselaer)
 Peter Robert Livingston (1737–1793) ∞ Margaret Livingston (1738–1809) (granddaughter of Robert Livingston the Younger)
 Maria "Mary" Livingston (1738–1821) ∞ James Duane (1733–1797)
 Mary Duane (b. 1762) ∞ 1787: William North (1755–1836)
 Adelia Duane (1765–1860) ∞ Alfred Sands Pell (1786–1831)
 Robert Livingston Pell (1811–1880) ∞ Maria Louisa Brinckerhoff (1816–1866)
 James Duane Pell (1813–1881) ∞ Sophia Gertrude Pell (1815-1885)
 George Washington Pell (1820–1896) ∞ Mary Bruen (d. 1890)
 Richard Montgomery Pell (1822–1882) ∞ Frances Mary Jones Hoyt (1839–1930)
 James Chatham Duane (1769–1842) ∞ Mary Ann Bowers (1773–1828)
 James Chatham Duane Jr. (b. 1794) ∞ Harriet Constable (1794–1860)
 James Chatham Duane III (1824–1897) ∞ Harriet Whitehorne Brewerton
 Sarah Duane (1775-1828) ∞ 1808: George William Featherstonhaugh (1780–1866)
 George William Featherstonhaugh, Jr. (1814–1900)
 Walter Livingston (1740–1797) ∞ Cornelia Schuyler (1746–1822) (granddaughter of Pieter Schuyler)
 Henry Walter Livingston (1768–1810) ∞ 1796: Mary Masters Allen (1776–1855) (granddaughter of William Allen)
 Henry Walter Livingston (1798–1848) ∞ 1823: Caroline de Grasse de Pau (1806–1871)
 Walter Livingston (1799–1872) ∞ 1828: Mary Livingston Greenleaf (1802–1886) (daughter of James Greenleaf)
 Mary Livingston (1803–1880) ∞ 1825: James Thomson, Jr. (d. 1847)
 Elizabeth Livingston (1807–1860) ∞ 1828: William Denning Henderson (1803–1852)
 Cornelia Livingston (1808–1884) ∞ 1828: Carroll Livingston (1805–1867) (son of Henry Brockholst Livingston)
 Anne Greenleaf Livingston (1809–1887) ∞ 1829: Anson Livingston (1807–1873) (son of Henry Brockholst Livingston)
 Maria Livingston (1770–1828) ∞ Philip Henry Livingston (1770–1831)
 Peter Schuyler Livingston (1772–1809) ∞ Eliza Barclay (1776–1817) (daughter of Thomas Henry Barclay)
 Robert L. Livingston (1775–1843) ∞ Margaret Maria Livingston (1783–1818) (daughter of Chancellor Livingston)
 Gertrude Livingston (1778–1864) ∞ William Cutting (1773–1820)
 Francis Brockholst Cutting (1804–1870) ∞ Anne Markoe Heyward (1807–1885)
 William Cutting (1832–1897)
 Francis Brockholst Cutting (1834–1869) ∞ Marion Ramsay (1834–1912)
 Francis Brockholst Cutting (1861–1896)
 Fulton Cutting (1816–1875) ∞ Elise Justine Bayard (1823–1852) (granddaughter of William Bayard Jr.)
 William Bayard Cutting (1850–1912) ∞ Olivia Peyton Murray (1855–1949)
 William Bayard Cutting, Jr. (1878–1910) ∞ 1901: Lady Sybil Marjorie Cuffe (daughter of Hamilton Cuffe, 5th Earl of Desart
 Justine Bayard Cutting (1879–1975) ∞ 1901 (div): George Cabot Ward (1876–1936)
 Bronson Murray Cutting (1888–1935)
  Olivia Murray Cutting (1892–1963) ∞ 1917: Henry James (son of William James)
 Harriet Livingston (1783–1826) ∞ (1) 1806: Robert Fulton (1765–1815); ∞ (2) 1816: Charles Augustus Dale (1784-1832)
 Cornelia Livingston Fulton (1812–1893) ∞ Edward Charles Crary (1806–1848)
 Mary Livingston Fulton (1813–1861) ∞ Robert Morris Ludlow (1812–1894)
 Robert "Cambridge" Livingston (1742–1794) ∞ Alice Swift (1751–1816), daughter of John Swift
 Catherine Livingston (1744–1832) ∞ John Patterson (1740–1823) (brother of Walter Patterson)
 Daniel Todd Patterson (1786–1839) ∞ George Ann Pollock (1787–1851)
 Elizabeth Catherine Patterson (1815–1884) ∞ George Mifflin Bache (1811–1846) (brother of Alexander Dallas Bache)
 Carlile Pollock Patterson (1816–1881) ∞ Elizabeth Worthington Pearson (1826–1902) (daughter of Joseph Pearson) 
 Georgia Ann Patterson (1820–1893) ∞ 1839: David Dixon Porter (1813–1891)
 Thomas Harmon Patterson (1820–1889) ∞ Maria Montresor Wainwright (d. 1881)
 Alida Livingston (1747–1791) ∞ Valentine Gardiner
 John Livingston (1749–1822) ∞ (1) Maria Ann Leroy (1759–1797) (daughter of Jacob Leroy and Cornelia Rutgers); ∞ (2) Catherine (Livingston) Ridley (daughter of William Livingston)
 Hendrick "Henry" Livingston (1752–1823)
 Peter Van Brugh Livingston (1712–1792) ∞ (1) Mary Alexander (1721–1767) (daughter of James Alexander & Mary Spratt Provoost) ∞ (2) 1771: Elizabeth Ricketts
 Philip Peter Livingston (1740–1810) ∞ Cornelia Van Horne (b. 1759) (daughter of David Van Horne)
 Peter Van Brugh Livingston (1792–1868) ∞ Maria "Harriet" Elizabeth Houston
 Elizabeth Ludlow Livingston (1836–1895) ∞ Joseph Montgomery Strong (1822–1894)
 Van Brugh Livingston (1840–1904) ∞ Ada Mary Jaudon (b. 1839)
 Catherine Livingston (1743–1775) ∞ Nicholas Bayard (1736–1798)
 James Alexander Livingston (b. 1744)
 Mary Livingston (b. 1746) ∞ John Brown
 Peter Van Brugh Livingston, Jr. (b. 1753) ∞ Susan Blondel
 Sarah Livingston (1755–1825) ∞ James Ricketts
 Susan Livingston (1759–1853) ∞ (1) 1789: John Kean (1756–1795); ∞ (2) 1800: Count Julian Niemcewicz (1758–1841) (aide to Kościuszko)
 Peter Philip James Kean (1788–1828) ∞ Sarah Sabina Morris (1788–1878)
 John Kean (1814–1895) ∞ Lucinetta "Lucy" Halstead (1825–1912) 
 John Kean (1852–1914)
 Christine Griffin Kean (1858–1936) ∞ William Emlen Roosevelt (1857–1930) (son of James A. Roosevelt)
 Hamilton Fish Kean (1862–1941) ∞ Katharine Taylor Winthrop (1866–1943)
 Robert Winthrop Kean (1893–1980) ∞ Elizabeth Stuyvesant Howard (1898-1988)
 Thomas Howard Kean (b. 1935) ∞ Deborah Bye
 Julia Ursin Niemcewiez Kean (1816–1887) ∞ Hamilton Fish (1808–1893)
  Christine Alexander William Kean (1826–1915) ∞ William Preston Griffin (1810–1851)
 Elizabeth Livingston (1761–1787) ∞ 1787: Louis-Guillaume Otto (1754–1817)
 John Livingston (1714–1786) ∞ Catharine de Peyster (1724–1804) (granddaughter of Abraham de Peyster)
 Philip Livingston (1716–1778) ∞ Christina Ten Broeck (1718–1801) (daughter of Dirck Ten Broeck)
 Philip Philip Livingston (1741–1787) ∞ Sara Johnson (1749–1802)
 Philip Henry Livingston (1769–1831) ∞ Maria Livingston (1770–1828) (daughter of Walter Livingston)
 Edward Livingston (1796–1840) ∞ Sarah Ray Lansing (1797–1848) (daughter of John Ten Eyck Lansing, Jr.)
 Edward Livingston (1834–1906) ∞ Fanny Hazeltine
 Clarisse Hazeltine Livingston (1834–1906) ∞ Fanny Hazeltine
 Edward Philip Livingston (1779–1843) ∞ (1) 1799: Elizabeth Stevens Livingston (1780–1829) (daughter of Chancellor Livingston); ∞ (2) 1832: Mary Crooke Broom (1804–1877) (later married Charles Herman Ruggles)
 Margaret Livingston (1808–1874) ∞ David Augustus Clarkson (1793–1874)
 Thomas Streatfeild Clarkson (1837–1894)
 Elizabeth Livingston (1813–1896) ∞ Edward Hunter Ludlow (1810–1884)
 Mary Livingston Ludlow (1843–1919) ∞ Valentine Gill Hall Jr. (1834–1880) 
 Anna Rebecca Hall (1863–1892) ∞ Elliott Roosevelt (socialite) (1860–1894) (brother of Theodore Roosevelt)
 Eleanor Roosevelt (1884–1962) ∞ Franklin D. Roosevelt (1882–1945)
 Elliott Roosevelt, Jr. (1889–1893)
  Gracie Hall Roosevelt (1891–1941) ∞ (1) Margaret Richardson (1892–1971); ∞ (2) Dorothy Kemp (1898–1985)
 Valentine Hall III (1867–1934)
 Edward Ludlow Hall (1872–1932)
 Clermont Livingston (1817–1895) ∞ Cornelia Livingston (1824–1851)
 Mary Livingston (d. 1876) ∞ 1874: Frederic de Peyster (1843–1874) (son of John Watts de Peyster)
 John Henry Livingston (1848–1927) ∞ (1) Catherine Livingston Hamersley (d. 1873) (sister of J. Hooker Hamersley); ∞ (2) Emily Evans
 Robert Edward Livingston (1820–1889) ∞ Susan Maria Clarkson de Peyster (1823–1910)
 Catharine Goodhue Livingston (1856–1931)
 Robert Robert Livingston (1858–1899) ∞ Mary Tailer (1863–1944)
 Edward De Peyster Livingston (1861–1932)
 Goodhue Livingston (1867–1951) ∞ married Louisa Robb (1877–1960) (daughter of J. Hampden Robb)
 Goodhue Livingston, Jr. (1897–1994) ∞ (1) 1919 (div 1931): Joan Livingston Allen (1898–1964) (daughter of Frederick Hobbes Allen); ∞ (2) 1932 (div 1950s) Lorna Mackay (1911–1986); (3) (div) Ruth Monsch Gordon; ∞ (4) 1966: Dorothy Michelson-Stevens-Bitter-Dick (d. 1994) (daughter of Albert A. Michelson)
 Cornelia Thayer Livingston (1903–1975) ∞ 1927: Frederic Cromwell Jr. (1900–1973)
 Katherine Cromwell (b. 1928) ∞ David Elmslie Moore (1923-2012), (son of William Scoville Moore and Edith Pulitzer and grandson of Joseph Pulitzer)
 Florence Cromwell (b. 1931)
 Seymour Cromwell III (1934–1977)
  Cornelia Livingston Cromwell ∞ 1958: Richard Pillard (b. 1933)
 Christina Livingston ∞ John Navarre Macomb (1774–1810) (son of Alexander Macomb)
 Catherine Livingston (1745–1810) ∞ (1) 1764: Stephen Van Rensselaer II (1742–1769); ∞ (2) 1775: Eilardus Westerlo (1738–1790)
 Stephen Van Rensselaer III (1764–1839) ∞ (1) 1783: Margarita Schuyler (1758–1801) ∞ (2) 1802: Cornelia Bell Paterson (1780–1844) (daughter of William Paterson) 
 Stephen Van Rensselaer IV (1789–1868) ∞ Harriet Elizabeth Bayard (1799–1875) (daughter of William Bayard Jr.)
 Philip Schuyler Van Rensselaer (1767–1824) ∞ Anne De Peyster Van Cortlandt (1766–1855) (sister of Philip Van Cortlandt)
 Rensselaer Westerlo (1776–1851) ∞ Jane Lansing (1785–1871) (daughter of John Ten Eyck Lansing, Jr.)
 Catharine Westerlo (1778–1846) ∞ John Woodworth (1768–1858)
 Margaret Livingston (1747–1830) ∞ Dr. Thomas Jones (1733–1794)
 Sarah Livingston (1752–1814) ∞ John Henry Livingston (1746–1825)
 Hendrick "Henry" Livingston (1719–1772)
 William Livingston (1723–1790) ∞ 1745 Susannah French (1723–1789) (granddaughter of Phillip French)
 Susannah Livingston (1748–1840) ∞ 1780: John Cleves Symmes (1742–1814) (father-in-law of William Henry Harrison)
 Catherine Livingston (1751–1813) ∞ (1) Matthew Ridley (1746–1789); ∞ (2) John Livingston (1750–1822) (son of Robert Livingston)
 Mary Livingston (b. 1753) ∞ 1771: James Linn
 William Livingston, Jr. (1754–1817) ∞ Mary Lennington
 Sarah Van Brugh Livingston (1756–1802) ∞ John Jay (1745–1829)
 Henry Brockholst Livingston (1757–1823) ∞ (1) 1784: Catherine Keteltas (1761–1804); ∞ (2) 1804: Ann N. Ludlow (1775–1815); ∞ (3) 1815: Catherine Seaman (1775–1859)
 Eliza Livingston (1786–1860) ∞ Jasper Hall Livingston (1780–1835) (son of Philip Philip Livingston)
 Susan French Livingston (1789–1864) ∞ Benjamin Ledyard (1779–1812)
 Catherine Augusta Livingston (b. c. 1790) ∞ Archibald McVicker (1785–1849)
 Carroll Livingston (1805–1867) ∞ Cornelia Livingston.
 Anson Livingston (1807–1873) ∞ Anne Greenleaf Livingston (1809–1887) (daughter of Henry Walter Livingston)
 Jasper Hall Livingston (1815–1900) ∞ 1851: Matilda Anne Cecila Morris (daughter of Sir John Morris, 2nd Baronet of Clasemont)
 Catherine Louise Livingston (b. 1815) ∞ Maurice Power (1811–1870)
 Henry Brockholst Livingston (1819–1892) ∞ Marianna Gribaldo
 Judith Livingston (1758-1843) ∞ John W. Watkins
 Sarah Livingston (1725–1805) ∞ 1748: William Alexander, Lord Stirling (1726–1783)
 Alida Livingston (1728–1790) ∞ (1) Henry Hansen (d. 1758); ∞ (2) Martinus Hoffman (1706–1772) (father-in-law of Isaac Roosevelt)
 Catherine Livingston (1733–1807) ∞ 1759: John Lawrence (1721–1764)
 Robert Livingston (1688–1775) ∞ Margaret Howarden (1693–1758)
 Robert R. Livingston (1718–1775) ∞ Margaret Beekman
 Chancellor Robert R. Livingston (1746–1813) ∞ 1770: Mary Stevens (1751–1814) (daughter of John Stevens)
 Elizabeth Stevens Livingston (1780–1829) ∞ Edward Philip Livingston (1779–1843)
 Margaret Maria Livingston (1783–1818) ∞ Robert L. Livingston (1775–1843) (son of Walter Livingston)
 Janet Livingston (d. 1824) ∞ 1773: Richard Montgomery (1738–1775)
 Margaret Livingston (1749–1823) ∞ Thomas Tillotson (1750–1832)
 Henry Beekman Livingston (1750–1831) ∞ 1781: Ann Hume Shippen (1763–1841) (daughter of Dr. William Shippen)
 Catharine Livingston (1752–1849) ∞ 1791: Freeborn Garrettson (1752–1827)
 John R. Livingston (1755–1851) ∞ (1) 1779: Margaret Sheafe; ∞ (2) 1789: Eliza McEvers (d. 1810)
 Robert Montgomery Livingston (1790–1838) ∞ 1811: Sarah Barclay Bache
 Serena Eliza Livingston (1795–1884) ∞ George Croghan (1791–1849) (nephew of William Clark)
 John Robert Livingston (1803–1871) ∞ Mary McEvers (1806–1843)
 Edward Louis Livingston (1829–1888) ∞ Mary Josephine Kernochan (1828–1908) (sister of James P. Kernochan and J. Frederic Kernochan)
 Mary Josephine Livingston (1854–1937) ∞ (1) 1872: Campbell Boyd (1842–1894); ∞ (2) 1895: Charles Joseph Blanc, Vicomte de Lanautte d'Hauterive (b. 1848); ∞ (3) 1913: Charles Gaston, Comte de Fontenilliat  
 Edward McEvers Livingston (1856–1938) ∞ Sarah McAlpine Pollack
 Helen Margaretta Livingston (1860–1929) ∞ 1896: Granville Frederick Richard Farquhar
 Gertrude Livingston (1757–1833) ∞ Morgan Lewis (1754–1844) (son of Francis Lewis)
 Margret Lewis (1780–1860) ∞ Maturin Livingston (1769–1847)
 Joanna Livingston (1759–1827) ∞ Peter R. Livingston (1766–1847)
 Alida Livingston (1761–1822) ∞ John Armstrong, Jr. (1758–1843) (son of Gen. John Armstrong, Sr.)
  Edward Livingston (1764–1836) ∞ 1778: Mary McEvers; ∞ (2) 1805: Madame Louise Moreau de Lassy (sister of Auguste Davezac)
 Hubertus "Gilbert" Livingston (1690–1746) ∞ Cornelia Beekman (1693–1742) (daughter of Hendrick Beekman and granddaughter of Wilhelmus Beekman)
 Robert Gilbert Livingston (1712–1789) ∞ Catherine McPheadres (1717–1792)
 Robert Gilbert Livingston (1749–1791) ∞ Margaret Hude (1751–1824)
 Helen Livingston (1751–1791) ∞ Samuel Hake
 Helen Hake (1773–1801) ∞ Frederic De Peyster (1758–1834) (nephew of Arent DePeyster)
 Frederic De Peyster (1796–1882) ∞ (1) 1820: Mary Justina Watts ∞ (2) 1839: Maria Antoinette Kane Hone (1798–1869)
 John Watts de Peyster (1821–1907) ∞ 1841: Estelle Livingston (1819–1898)
 Catherine Livingston (1756–1829) ∞ John Reade (1745–1808)
 Catherine Livingston Reade (1777–1863) ∞ Nicholas William Stuyvesant (1769–1833)
 Ann Reade (b. 1783) ∞ Robert Kearney (1783–1832)
 Susan Watts Kearney (1819–1893) ∞ William Ingram Street (son of Randall S. Street)
  Anna Livingston Reade Street (1846–1918) ∞ Levi Parsons Morton (1824–1920)
  Helen Sarah Reade (1787–1879) ∞ James Hooker (1792–1858)
 Gilbert Robert Livingston (1758–1816) ∞ Martha De Lancey Kane (1758–1843)
 Henry Gilbert Livingston (1758–1817) ∞ Ann Nutter
  Simon Johnson Livingston (b. 1762)
 Henry Gilbert Livingston (1714–1799) ∞ Susannah Storm Conklin (1724–1793)
 Gilbert Livingston (1742–1806) ∞ 1763: Catherine Crannell (1745–1830)
  Sarah Livingston (1777–1833) ∞ Smith Thompson (1768–1843)
 John Henry Livingston (1746—1825) ∞ 1775: Sarah Livingston (1752–1814)
  Henry Alexander Livingston (1776–1849)
 Henry Livingston Jr. (1748–1828) ∞ (1) Sarah Welles ∞ (2): Jane McLean Patterson (1769–1838)
 Cornelia Livingston (1750–1810) ∞ Myndert Van Kleeck (1744–1799)
 Catherine Elizabeth Livingston (1751–1828) ∞ (1) Thomas Mifflin (1744–1800) ∞ (2) Peter Close, Sr. (b. 1751)
 Joanna Livingston (1754–1795) ∞ Paul Schenck (1741–1817)
 Susan Livingston (1755–1781) ∞ Gerardus Duyckinck (1754–1814) 
 Alida Livingston Woolsey (1758–1843) ∞ 1779: Melancthon Lloyd Woolsey (1754–1819)
  Melancthon Taylor Woolsey (1782–1838)
 Robert Henry Livingston (1760–1804) ∞ Catherine "Cady" Tappan (1772–1841)
 Beekman Livingston (b. 1762)  ∞ Catherine Marsh (1772–1854)
 Helena Livingston  (1767–1859) ∞ Jonas Platt (1769–1834)
  Zephaniah Platt (1796–1871)
 Alida Livingston (1716–1798) ∞ (1) 1737: Jacob Rutsen (1716–1753); ∞ (2) 1762: Hendrick van Rensselaer (1712–1793) 
 Johannes Rutsen (1743–1771) ∞ (1) 1767: Phebe Carmen (1747–1819) (Phebe married Robert Sands (1745–1835) after Johannes death)
 Cornelia Rutsen (1746–1790) ∞ Robert Van Rensselaer (1740–1802)
 Joanna Livingston (1722–1808) ∞ Pierre Van Cortlandt (1721–1814)
 James Livingston (1728–1790) ∞ Judith Newcomb (1733–1808)
 Cornelia Livingston (1751–1820) ∞ (1) Lawrence Van Kleeck (1749–1783); ∞ (2) Andrew Billings (1743–1808)
 Judith Newcomb Livingston (b. 1753) ∞ John Moore, Esq. (1745–1828)
 Gilbert James Livingston (1758–1833) ∞ Susannah Lewis (1761–1822)
 Judith Lewis Livingston (1785–1858) ∞ Samuel Butler (1785–1851)
 Courtland Philip Livingston Butler (1813–1891) ∞ Elizabeth Slade Pierce (1822–1901)
 Mary Elizabeth Butler (1850–1897) ∞ Robert Emmet Sheldon (1845–1917)
 Flora Sheldon (1872–1920) ∞ Samuel Prescott Bush (1863–1948) (son of James Smith Bush)
 Prescott Sheldon Bush (1895–1972) ∞ Dorothy Walker (1901–1992) (daughter of George Herbert Walker)
 Prescott Sheldon Bush, Jr. (1922–2010)
 George Herbert Walker Bush (1924–2018) ∞ Barbara Pierce (1925–2018)
 Nancy Walker Bush (b. 1926) ∞ 1946 (div. 1989) Alexander Ellis II (1922–1989)
 Jonathan James Bush (b. 1931) ∞ Josephine Bradley
 William Henry Trotter Bush (1938—2018)
 Theodore Earl Butler (1861–1936) ∞ 1892: Suzanne Hoschedé (c. 1864–1899) (daughter of Alice Hoschedé and Ernest Hoschedé, and stepdaughter of Claude Monet)
 Margaret Livingston (1738–1818) ∞ Peter Stuyvesant (1727–1805), (great-grandson of Peter Stuyvesant)
 Nicholas William Stuyvesant (1769–1833) ∞ Catherine Livingston Reade (1777–1863)
 Joanna Livingston (1694–1734) ∞ Cornelius Gerrit Van Horne (1694–1752)
 Gerrit Van Horne (1726–1765) ∞ 1751: Anne Reade (1726–1772) (daughter of Joseph Reade)

References
Notes

Sources
Royal Descents, Notable Kin, and Printed Sources #69 by Gary Boyd Roberts from the New England Historic Genealogical Society.
Genealogy of the Livingston Family by Timothy Alden, published in 1814.

External links
Finding aid for the Livingston Family Papers, 1719-1929 at the Museum of the City of New York
 The Livingstons of Livingston Manor by Edwin Brockholst Livingston

 
Families from New York (state)
Family trees
American families